Greencastle is a 2012 American drama film directed by, written by, and starring Koran Dunbar. The story follows Poitier Dunning, a single father who works as an Assistant Manager at a small town pet shop, as he enters a "quarter-life crisis" impelled by a recent tragedy. Greencastle intertwines lives of loneliness and disconnection, fatefully leading Poitier toward an unexpected and sublime awakening.

Cast
Koran Dunbar as Poitier Dunning
Aurelius Dunbar as Julian Dunning
Nikki Estridge as Leslie Davis
Quevaughn Bryant as Poitier's Father
Ralph Mauriello (actor)|Ralph Mauriello as Rocco Mazzagatti
Doua Moua as Nu Vang
Christopher James Raynor as Rick
Hans Scharler as Roy Baker, District Dean

Production
Filming took place in and around Greencastle, Pennsylvania and Philadelphia, Pennsylvania from June to August 2011. Greencastle premiered at the Maryland Theater in Hagerstown, MD on March 31, 2012. Jonathan Austin is the cinematographer for the film.

References

External links
 

2012 films
Films shot in Pennsylvania
2012 drama films
American drama films
2010s English-language films
2010s American films